Patrick Mullins known as Pat (1929–1981), was an Irish born champion trainer of Great Britain.

Personal life 
He met Linda Chapelle and they had four sons; three of which (John, David and Kelly) became trainers in their own right at later dates. They ran the greyhound business from kennels in Manningtree, Essex. They married in 1980 but Pat collapsed and died while working at the kennels just one year later in 1981.

Career
He initially trained from kennels near Hadleigh, Suffolk and won the 1978 English Greyhound Derby with Lacca Champion. He later trained out of the Old Hall Kennels in Mistley, Manningtree, Essex and won a Scottish Greyhound Derby, Pall Mall, three Grand Prix's and a Gold Collar. Linda took over the kennels following his death in March 1981.

Awards
Despite being Irish born he was voted the United Kingdom Greyhound Trainer of the Year in 1980.

References 

British greyhound racing trainers
Irish greyhound racing trainers
1929 births
1981 deaths